Valentina Gorinevskaya (1882 – 1953), was a military surgeon and trauma specialist.

Life
Valentina Valentinovna Gorinevskaya was born in 1882 and graduated from the St Petersburg Medical Institute for Women in 1908. She worked in the surgical clinic of Peter and Paul Hospital from 1908 to 1914. When World War I began in 1914, Gorinevskaya became the first woman to become a senior surgeon in a military hospital of the Imperial Russian Army. "There was little fighting on the Allied eastern front in 1917, but nevertheless, hundreds of casualties had accumulated by this time in military hospitals". After the war, she became a professor of general surgery at Samara University in 1919 before moving to Moscow, where she was the head of the surgical department at the Obukh Institute. Then she became a surgeon at the Traumatological Department of the Institute of Therapy and Prosthetics professor of surgery at the Central Institute of Postgraduate Medical Training. Gorinevskaya joined the Workers' and Peasants' Red Army ( and served as the chair of field surgery in 1931–1939 and chief surgeon during the Khalkhin Gol Campaign of 1939. She served as a senior inspector of the Main Military Medical Board during World War II and died in 1953.

Work
"Gorinevskaya was one of the first Soviet surgeons to introduce the primary surgical study of wounds from industrial accidents. She pioneered traumatology as a separate branch of surgery and devised treatment in hospitals for lightly wounded soldiers. She published at least ninety books and articles, including books on traumatology, first aid, and comprehensive surgical treatment." While, "Unable to serve in the military or as government physicians were willing to endure the difficult conditions and thus found a niche for themselves as young physicians."

Notes

References
 Cournand A, Motley HL, Werko L, Richards DW. Physiological studies of the effects of intermittent positive pressure breathing on cardiac output in man. Am J Physiol 1948; 125: 164-174.
 DenBeste-Barnett, Michelle D. Earnestly Working to Improve Russia’s Future : Russian Women Physicians 1867-1905. 1997. EBSCOhost
 Ogilvie, Marilyn & Harvey, Joy, eds. (2000). The Biographical Dictionary of Women in Science: Pioneering Lives From Ancient Times to the mid-20th Century. 1: A-K. New York, NY: Routledge. .
 Sourkes, T. L., and S. R. Sourkes. “Medical Demobilization in Wartime Russia, 1917 to 1918.” American Journal of Cardiology, vol. 68, no. 6, 1991, p. 1. EBSCOhost

1882 births
1953 deaths
Soviet surgeons
Women surgeons
20th-century surgeons
Surgeons from the Russian Empire
Soviet military doctors
Soviet women physicians
Women in the Russian and Soviet military